Elżbieta Małgorzata Kruk (born 19 November 1959 in Lublin) is a Polish politician, a member of Law and Justice (national conservative political party in Poland). She was elected to Sejm on 25 September 2005.

External links
Sejm Page

1959 births
Living people
Politicians from Lublin
Law and Justice politicians
Members of the Polish Sejm 2001–2005
Women members of the Sejm of the Republic of Poland
Members of the Polish Sejm 2005–2007
21st-century Polish women politicians
Members of the Polish Sejm 2007–2011
Members of the Polish Sejm 2011–2015
MEPs for Poland 2019–2024